Communidad Hebrea Hatikva, a Conservative synagogue located in Santiago de Cuba, is the first Jewish congregation to host a website in Cuba.

References

Conservative Judaism in North America
Conservative synagogues
Synagogues in Cuba
Buildings and structures in Santiago de Cuba